Riccal was a rural district in the East Riding of Yorkshire, England from 1894 to 1935.

It was formed in 1894 from that part of the Selby rural sanitary district which was in the East Riding (the rest in the West Riding, going on to form Selby Rural District).

The rural district contained eight civil parishes:
 Barlby
 Cliffe cum Lund
 Kelfield
 North Duffield
 Osgodby
 Riccall
 South Duffield
 Skipwith

In 1935, under a County Review Order made under the Local Government Act 1929, it was abolished, and mostly became part of a new Derwent Rural District, with a small part going to Howden Rural District.

References

External links

Districts of England created by the Local Government Act 1894
Rural districts of the East Riding of Yorkshire